Follower or variants may refer to:

People and roles
 Follower (Australian rules football), Australian rules position
 Follower, a colloquial term for a debt collector
 Camp follower, a civilian who follows in the wake of an army
Friending and following on social networks
Ghost followers
Groupie, a fan or aficionado

Arts, entertainment, and media

Films
Followers (2000 film), an American film
Followers (2021 film), a British horror film
The Follower (1984 film), a Soviet film directed by Rodion Nakhapetov
The Follower (2014 film), a film directed by Dennis Gansel
The Followers, a 1939 television film of the play by Harold Brighouse, with Austin Trevor,  Marjorie Mars,  Marjorie Lane

Literature
 "Follower" (short story), a 1990 story by Orson Scott Card
Follower, novel by Stephen Gallagher
Followers, teen horror novel by Anna Davies 2014 
 "The Follower" (poem), a poem by Seamus Heaney
 Jedi Apprentice: The Followers, a Star Wars novel
The Follower, novel by Patrick Quentin 1950
The Follower, novel by  Henry Bromell 1983
The Follower, novel by Jason Starr 2007
The Followers, by Jude Watson 2002
The Followers, by Christopher Nicole 2005
The Followers, a 1915 play by Harold Brighouse, after the story by Elizabeth Gaskell

Music
The Follower (album), a 2016 album by The Field, or the title song 
Followers (album), a 2016 album by Tenth Avenue North

Television
"Rm9sbG93ZXJz", an X-Files episode that signifies "followers" in Base64
Followers (TV series), a 2020 Japanese streaming television series

Other uses

 Cam follower, a specialized type of roller or needle bearing designed to follow cams.

See also
 Disciple (disambiguation)
 Follow (disambiguation)
 Following (disambiguation)